Jeannette Korten (born 31 January 1976) is an Australian alpine skier. She competed in two events at the 2002 Winter Olympics.

References

1976 births
Living people
Australian female alpine skiers
Olympic alpine skiers of Australia
Alpine skiers at the 2002 Winter Olympics
Sportspeople from Geneva